HMS Trial or Tryall is the name of several vessels of the Royal Navy or its predecessors:

, a pink listed as in naval service from 1645 to 1647
, a 10-gun sloop launched in 1713 and broken up in 1719
, a 10-gun sloop launched in 1719 and broken up in 1731
, an 8-gun sloop launched in 1732 and scuttled in the South Pacific in 1741
, a 14-gun sloop launched in 1744 and broken up in 1776
, a 12-gun cutter in service from 1781 to 1794
, a 12-gun cutter launched 1790 and converted to a coal hulk in 1816; sold out of service in 1848
, a 6-gun vessel listed as in Navy service from 1805 to 1811

References
 
 

Royal Navy ship names